The Standing Joint Force Headquarters (SJFHQ) is a rapidly deployable component that provides operational command and control to the Joint Expeditionary Force and the Combined Joint Expeditionary Force (Anglo-French alliance) when on small and medium-sized operations. The headquarters is responsible to the Chief of Joint Operations through the Chief of Staff (Operations). The Joint Force Headquarters (JFHQ) and Joint Force Logistics Component Headquarters (JFLogC) both come under the command of the SJFHQ Commander and are based at Northwood Headquarters.

References

Military units and formations of the United Kingdom
Military headquarters